Robert Chamberot (born 25 February 1939) is a Canadian wrestler. He competed in the men's freestyle 87 kg at the 1968 Summer Olympics.

References

1939 births
Living people
Canadian male sport wrestlers
Olympic wrestlers of Canada
Wrestlers at the 1968 Summer Olympics
Place of birth missing (living people)
Commonwealth Games medallists in wrestling
Commonwealth Games gold medallists for Canada
Wrestlers at the 1966 British Empire and Commonwealth Games
Pan American Games medalists in wrestling
Pan American Games silver medalists for Canada
Wrestlers at the 1967 Pan American Games
20th-century Canadian people
Medallists at the 1966 British Empire and Commonwealth Games